Dontay Demus Jr. (born September 26, 2000) is an American football wide receiver for the Maryland Terrapins.

High school career
Demus Jr. attended Friendship Collegiate Academy Public Charter School in Washington, D.C. As a senior, he had 66 receptions for 1,167 yards and 12 touchdowns. He committed to the University of Maryland, College Park to play college football.

College career
As a true freshman at Maryland in 2018, Demus Jr. played in all 12 games with one start and had 13 receptions for 278 yards. As a sophomore in 2019, he started all 12 games, recording 41 receptions for 625 yards and six touchdowns. As a junior in 2020, he started all five games and had 24 receptions for 365 yards and four touchdowns. Demus Jr. returned to Maryland as a starter in 2021, leading the Big Ten in receiving yards before suffering a season-ending knee injury in a game against Iowa.  Demus came back to Maryland for his 5th season for 2022 after his injury the previous season. Instead of playing in the 2022 Duke's Mayo Bowl he opted out of the bowl game with fellow teammates Deonte Banks, Rakim Jarrett, and Jacob Copeland.

In January 2023, Demus was invited to participate in the 2023 NFL Combine.

Notes

References

External links

Maryland Terrapins bio

2000 births
Living people
American football wide receivers
Maryland Terrapins football players
Players of American football from Washington, D.C.